The National Church of England Academy, formerly known as The National School, is a Church of England secondary school in the Ashfield district of Nottinghamshire, England.

History
The National Academy was a co-member of the National Tuxford Learning Community (NTLC), a non-statutory federation of the National CE and Tuxford Schools. Since this collaboration began in 2007, several other schools/academies have joined, and NTLC has been renamed Diverse Academies Trust. The name reflects the ethos of the collaboration; member schools work closely together, sharing good practice while retaining (and celebrating) their individuality and diversity. The school was given Academy Status on 1 August 2011. The academy left the Diverse Academies Trust in 2019.

School campus
The school was built in two phases, in the late 1970s and early 80s.  A purpose built science block was added in 2004. Playing fields look out onto open land beyond the northern edge of the town. The buildings have been well maintained; recently, the school was awarded funds by the EFA to upgrade heating, roofing, and security. The site is landscaped and green.

Academic performance
In 2016, the school's performance was above the national average at both Key Stage 4 and 5. At Key Stage 5, there was a 100% pass rate; 79% of grades were A*-C; 56% were A*-B and 36% were at grade A*/A.

See also
The Holgate Academy
Hucknall Sixth Form Centre

References

External links
Hucknall National Primary School

Academies in Nottinghamshire
Ashfield District
Church of England secondary schools in the Diocese of Southwell and Nottingham
Educational institutions established in 1788
1788 establishments in England
Secondary schools in Nottinghamshire